Derrick Edward Summers (born June 19, 1988) is an American football defensive lineman who is currently a free agent. He played as a defensive end for the University of Toledo.

Derrick Summers started his AFL Journey with the Jacksonville Sharks in 2011. He played three seasons for the Sharks, helping them win three South Division Championships (2011–13), the 2011 American Conference Championship, and the 2011 AFL World Championship as the Sharks defeated the Arizona Rattlers In Arena Bowl XXIV.

On May 14, 2012, Summers signed a one-year contract with the Toronto Argonauts of the Canadian Football League.  He was released by the Argonauts on October 18, 2012. He was signed by the Hamilton Tiger-Cats and the subsequently released on May 15, 2013, prior to the beginning of the 2013 CFL season.

On November 11, 2015, Summers was assigned to the Los Angeles KISS.

On October 14, 2016, Summers was assigned to the Cleveland Gladiators during the dispersal draft. He earned Second Team All-Arena honors in 2017.
He also helped the Gladiators reach the Semi-finals of the 2017 AFL Playoffs.

On March 19, 2018, Summers was assigned to the Albany Empire. Summers earned Second Team All-Arena honors for the 2018 season.

On March 5, 2019, Summers was assigned to the Columbus Destroyers.

Summers is now currently ranked Fourth All Time in Arena History in Sacks with 50 career sacks.

References

External links

 Toledo Rockets bio
 Jacksonville Sharks bio
 

1988 births
Living people
American football fullbacks
American football defensive ends
American football linebackers
American players of Canadian football
Canadian football defensive linemen
Jacksonville Sharks players
Toledo Rockets football players
University of Toledo alumni
Sportspeople from Southfield, Michigan
Players of American football from Michigan
Toronto Argonauts players
Spokane Shock players
Los Angeles Kiss players
Cleveland Gladiators players
Hamilton Tiger-Cats players
Albany Empire (AFL) players
Columbus Destroyers players